Stacey Franks ( McClean, born 17 February 1989) is an English pop singer. She was part of the S Club 7 spin-off band, S Club 8 and in 2009 took part in the sixth series of The X Factor.

Career

2001–05: S Club Juniors 

Franks was born in Bispham, Blackpool, Lancashire. In 2001 she auditioned for a place in the group S Club 7 on their 2002 Carnival Tour. She won a part in the S Club Juniors, aged 12 years old. In 2002 the group released four singles and guest starred in Viva S Club.

After S Club split up in 2003, 19 Entertainment decided to keep S Club Juniors going, so they were renamed S Club 8 and released a further three songs. In 2004, McClean, along with the other members of S Club 8, appeared in the children's musical television comedy I Dream, which was filmed in Spain. The programme lasted for thirteen episodes, from 22 September to 13 December 2004, and was broadcast on BBC One. S Club 8 disbanded in 2005.

2009: The X Factor 

In 2009, Franks auditioned for The X Factor in Manchester, singing the Christina Aguilera song "Ain't No Other Man". Her audition was shown on the 100th episode of the show, screened on 19 September 2009. She made it through to boot camp, then after the first task of singing with other acts she made it into the top 50 acts, where she had to sing a solo performance to reach the final 24.

She made the final 24, and along with five others was placed in the Girls (16–24) category, in which her mentor was Dannii Minogue assisted by her sister, Kylie. In the final audition, held at Atlantis, The Palm, Palm Jumeirah, Dubai, McClean sang the Britney Spears song "Sometimes", but was eliminated before the live shows.

2010–present: Recent work 
In 2010, Franks took up a post as a receptionist at the UK radio station talkSPORT. She continues to pursue her singing career in her spare time.

In December 2010, Franks began a 6-month tour of the UK as one of the stars of G*Mania an all singing all dancing stage production.

In late 2012, Franks, alongside former colleagues, Daisy Evans, Aaron Renfree, and Jay Asforis announced via Twitter that they would be reforming as S Club Juniors. The group's first performance took place on 14 January 2013 at Essex Students Union. They also made the decision to create an official "S Club Juniors" band on Twitter, @SCJOfficial. However, the reunion was short-lived and disbanded following a lack of support from the public.

In December 2021, Franks joined S Club Allstars replacing former S Club 7 member Jo O'Meara.

Personal life 
Franks attended Beacon Hill High School in Blackpool. She worked as an Admin manager at 106.5 Central Radio in Lancashire whilst co-hosting the breakfast show, but has since left. She lives in London. She is quarter Nigerian in her ethnicity. Stacey is married to former footballer Fraser Franks.

Discography

Media appearances

Television

Radio

References

External links 
 

1989 births
21st-century Black British women singers
English child singers
English people of Nigerian descent
English women pop singers
Living people
People from Bispham, Blackpool
S Club 8 members
The X Factor (British TV series) contestants